The Cotswold Line is an  railway line between  and  in England.

History

Early years
The line between Oxford and Worcester was built under an 1845 Act of Parliament and opened in 1851 as part of the Oxford, Worcester and Wolverhampton Railway.

The Act required the line to be built to Isambard Kingdom Brunel's  broad gauge but delays, disputes and increasing costs led to its being completed as  standard gauge.

The first stage of the Worcester and Hereford Railway opened between Henwick and Malvern Link on 25 July 1859. The bridge over the River Severn was approved for traffic the following year, and trains started running through from Malvern Link to Worcester Shrub Hill station on 17 May 1860. A short extension from Malvern Link to  opened on 25 May 1860.

On 1 July 1860 the Oxford, Worcester and Wolverhampton Railway absorbed both the Worcester & Hereford Railway and the Newport, Abergavenny & Hereford Railway to form the West Midland Railway.

On 13 September 1861 the final stage of the railway opened between Malvern Wells and Shelwick Junction. This junction is just north of Hereford station on the line between Hereford and Shrewsbury, and it finally created a through route between Worcester and Hereford.

The Great Western Railway took over the West Midland Railway in 1863.

The original tunnel through the ridge of the Malvern Hills, Colwall Tunnel, was completed in July 1860. However, the tunnel was unstable, and it was closed for short periods in 1861 and again in 1907 following rock falls. Eventually the GWR decided to build a new tunnel to the south of the existing one. This opened for traffic on 2 August 1926. The old tunnel was abandoned, and during World War II it was used to store torpedoes.

In the early 1970s, 25 miles from Moreton-in-Marsh to Norton Junction, Worcester were converted from double to single track.

Following serious floods, which washed parts of embankments away, the line was closed for about a fortnight during July and August 2007 for repairs.

Improvement works 2008–2011
This was intended to improve reliability, enable non-stop operations and allow an hourly off peak service to run on the line. The Office of Rail Regulation approved the work in June 2008, although the planned work was over-budget and had to await final approval. In December 2008 vegetation was cleared. A six-week closure of all or part of the line between Oxford and Worcester for preparatory works took place in July and August 2009. Further weekend work planned for February 2010 was postponed by Network Rail. Initial work began in autumn of 2010, with the majority of the second track being relaid between December 2010 and May 2011 when the line was closed at 21.30 from Monday to Thursday. Footbridges at Charlbury and Honeybourne as well as preparation for the upgrade of six Level Crossings. The new double track section between Charlbury and Ascott re-opened on 6 June 2011; the line between Oxford and Moreton-in-Marsh having been closed during the previous nine days. The section between Moreton and Evesham reopened as double track on 22 August 2011 with the line closed for the preceding two weeks.

Platform extensions 2018 
The line was closed from 16 to 25 November 2018, between Moreton-In-Marsh and Worcester, so that platforms could be extended to accommodate Class 800 trains.

Opening of Worcestershire Parkway 2020 
Worcestershire Parkway railway station opened in February 2020, following a long-standing proposal for a new split-level station where the line crosses over the Birmingham and Bristol Railway route. Connecting services are provided by CrossCountry on the Cardiff to Nottingham line and there is parking for 483 cars.

Route
The line comprises all or part of the following Network Rail routes:

GW 200 from Oxford
GW 310 from Wolvercot Junction
GW 300 from Norton Junction
GW 340 from Worcester Shrub Hill
GW 730 from Shelwick Junction to Hereford

Infrastructure
The line is single track between the following places:
Worcester Shrub Hill through  to Henwick.

Other sections are double track.

Significant civil engineering structures on the line include Campden Tunnel, the Colwall Tunnels, Ledbury Tunnel and viaducts at Worcester and Ledbury.

Detail

Oxford to Charlbury
After departing Oxford station, the Cotswold Line shares track with the Cherwell Valley Line to Banbury. Immediately east of the current line is the Rewley Road Swing Bridge over the channel which used to carry the London and North Western Railway's (LNWR) Buckinghamshire Railway line to its terminus at Oxford Rewley Road. The swing bridge is a listed building. The Rewley Road station building has been dismantled and re-erected at Buckinghamshire Railway Centre. The built up area east of the railway, visible across the Oxford Canal, is Jericho, a district which originated as lodgings outside the city walls where travellers could rest if they arrived after the gates were locked. The Eagle Ironworks of William Lucy & Co. was near the first road bridge over the track on Walton Well Road.

After the bridge, the open area to the left is Port Meadow, a water meadow bordering the Thames with a Bronze Age round barrow. The former LNWR Buckinghamshire Railway branches away to the north east. The section from Oxford to Bicester has been connected to the Chiltern Main Line by a new chord at Bicester, enabling through trains from Oxford to London Marylebone to run from September 2015. Proposals exist for re-opening the whole line and are included in the Draft Milton Keynes & South Midlands Sub-Regional Strategy, but there are many planning and funding matters to be resolved.

The line passes through Wolvercote. To the west, Lower Wolvercote was a centre for paper making, mainly for the Oxford University Press from the 17th century until 1998 and is the site of Godstow abbey, a Benedictine convent founded in the 12th century. The line passes under the viaduct carrying the A34 Oxford Western Bypass and  further under the A40 road linking London and Fishguard.

The line now turns west; here the former Buckinghamshire Junction Railway link with the Buckinghamshire Railway used to converge from the east. About  after Oxford station,  station was in the short stretch between here and where the Witney Railway diverged to the south-west. So far, the line has been close to the River Thames but the river now swings away to the south through a landscape dotted with gravel pits. The line now climbs the valley of the River Evenlode repeatedly crossing and re-crossing the river.  station serves the villages of Long Hanborough, Church Hanborough, Freeland and Bladon. The Oxford Bus Museum is next to Hanborough station.

From Hanborough the line enters the Cotswold Area of Outstanding Natural Beauty and  beyond Hanborough is  station. Building the line through Combe was difficult with several deep cuttings, four crossings of the Evenlode, and the diversion of a length of the river. To the south, just after the third river crossing are the remains of North Leigh Roman Villa. About  beyond the villa the line crosses the course of Akeman Street Roman road. Between Finstock and Charlbury the deer park to the west of the line is Cornbury Park, original venue for the Cornbury Music Festival, which has now been replaced by the Wilderness Festival. The woodlands south west of the park are the remains of Wychwood Forest named after the Hwicce, one of the Anglo-Saxon peoples of Britain. Charlbury station is the start of the redoubled track and is first stop for faster trains over the line and retains its original Oxford, Worcester and Wolverhampton Railway clapperboard building. Sir Peter Parker lived nearby at Minster Lovell and was a regular user of Charlbury station while chairman of the British Railways Board (1976 to 1983). The patronage of the head of the organisation may have helped to save the line at a time when the Serpell Report was calling for more rail closures. This is section of track has a maximum speed of

Charlbury to Moreton-in-Marsh
The line is now heading south-west and the site of Ascot d'Oilly Castle is to the north-west as the train enters Ascott-under-Wychwood. Few trains call at  station, but there is a signal box controlling the level crossing and the points that were formerly the end of the single track section from Wolvercot Junction.  beyond Ascott is  station which serves the villages of Shipton-under-Wychwood, Milton-under-Wychwood and Fifield.

Still following the Evenlode, the line now turns north-west. There is another level crossing near Bruern Abbey. Kingham village is north of the station. The village west of the station is Bledington. The Oxfordshire Way which has been close to the railway since Akeman Street now turns west to Bourton-on-the-Water but it is replaced by another long-distance footpath, the Diamond Way. Beyond Kingham, the line passes through the site of the former  railway station, closed in 1966. At Moreton-in-Marsh the line crosses the course of another major Roman road, the Fosse Way which linked Isca Dumnoniorum (Exeter) and Lindum Colonia (Lincoln). Moreton-in-Marsh was the headquarters of the railway spot-hire company Cotswold Rail until the company moved to Gloucester.

Moreton-in-Marsh to Hereford

About  after Oxford is Moreton-in-Marsh. This was once the southern end of the Stratford and Moreton Tramway. The line then passes the corner of the Roman town of Dorn. The Cotswold Line leaves the Evenlode which drains into the Thames and enters the catchment of the River Severn. The first level crossing appears. The building west of the crossing is a brick works and the neighbouring pits were the site of Jurassic clay extraction for the works. The village to the north is Paxford. The large country house to the west is Northwick Park, former home of Edward Spencer-Churchill and site of a United States Army hospital during World War II and afterwards a centre for Polish refugees. From here the line goes into cutting, then the  Campden Tunnel under the Cotswold escarpment. In 1851 unrest among the navvies building the tunnel resulted in a riot – the 'Battle of Campden Tunnel'.

The next station is Honeybourne. The track to the north remains as a link to the large former military depot at Long Marston. There is a good business case for the restoration of the Stratford-Cotswolds link. The large compound to the north with high walls, chapel, and floodlights is Long Lartin prison. There is another level crossing, where  station used to be. The line crosses the River Avon into Evesham. Opposite Evesham's Cotswold Line station is the former Midland Railway station, once on the Ashchurch & Barnt Green line.

West of Pershore, where the line crosses over the Cross Country Route, the new Worcestershire Parkway station has been opened. Just beyond, the line passes through Norton Junction where there was formerly a station. The junction links the line to the Cross Country Route. Here double track restarts.

About  after Oxford is Worcester Shrub Hill station. Worcester Foregate Street station gives connections to the city centre and other lines to Birmingham.  later the line reaches Malvern Link station. Great Malvern station follows, and  later is the site of the former Malvern Wells station. This is the second Colwall tunnel; the entrance to the original tunnel can be seen to the north. When the tunnel is below the ridge of the Malvern Hills, the line crosses the boundary between Worcestershire and Herefordshire. The line reaches Colwall station, where The Coca-Cola Company plant (now demolished) next to the station used to bottle Malvern Water, a local mineral water. Next to the bridge carrying the B4218 road over the railway is an unusual five-sided cottage. When the railway was built one corner had to be demolished and replaced by a plain wall. After passing through another tunnel, Ledbury station is passed and Hereford station ends the journey on the line.

Services
, the previous off peak weekday service continues: roughly an hourly service between London and Worcester. Due to constraints of the former single track, there are some two-hour gaps. These services are extensions of the half-hourly Oxford fast trains. Some of the former gaps have been partly filled by three additional trains as far as Moreton-in-Marsh (running through from/to London Paddington). 

During peak hours, both Oxford fast trains are extended to Worcester, giving a half-hourly service. Overall, about half the trains continue to/from Great Malvern and five trains a day continue to and from Hereford.

There is also an additional commuter service to and from Oxford in the morning and evening, which additionally calls at the halts (their "Parliamentary" service, preventing their closure).

The historic problem of some trains having to wait at passing loops, extending journey times, has been eliminated by the redoubling, although some still have to wait at Charlbury or Evesham.

Due to short platforms, passengers alighting at stations except Shrub Hill, Worcestershire Parkway, Oxford and Hereford should listen to onboard announcements telling them from which coaches they should alight. Normally this is from the 2–5 coaches at the country end of the train (further from the ticket barrier at ).

In 2007 some trains in the morning rush hour started at  but this was discontinued from December 2008.

Usage
The busiest stations on this line are the city stations at Oxford, Worcester and Hereford, followed by Great Malvern. The busiest station served exclusively by Great Western Railway's Cotswold Line services is Charlbury, followed by Moreton-in-Marsh.

Poetry
The line features in two notable poems: "Adlestrop" by Edward Thomas and "Pershore Station, or A Liverish Journey First Class" by John Betjeman.

References

Sources and further reading

 New Adlestrop Railway Atlas.

External links

 Hansard for 3 March 2004 — Record of House of Commons adjournment debate on the Cotswold Line.

Rail transport in Oxfordshire
Rail transport in Gloucestershire
Rail transport in Worcestershire
Rail transport in Herefordshire
Railway lines in South East England
Transport in Oxford
Transport in Worcester, England
Hereford
Railway lines opened in 1851
Railway lines in South West England
Railway lines in the West Midlands (region)
Cotswolds
1851 establishments in England